A pollen calendar is used to show the peak pollen times for different types of plant pollen, which causes allergic reactions in certain people.

In forensics
A pollen calendar can be a very useful tool in forensic science, because it can be used to place the month, or week, or date of death.  The use of pollen for criminal investigation purposes is called "forensic palynology".

However, the use of a pollen calendar to set the date of death should be used with extreme caution, and only by a carefully trained expert witness.  The CSI effect has put pressure on some police officers and district attorneys to provide pollen-based evidence, but such evidence "appear[s] to be of limited use in the forensic context where outcomes are scrutinised in court."

See also
Aeroallergen 
 National Pollen and Aerobiology Research Unit
Hay fever

References

External links
 United States pollen calendars (Does not lead to any pollen calendars)
 Pollen calendar for the UK created by the National Pollen and Aerobiology Research Unit at the University of Worcester
 New Zealand allergy pages and New Zealand pollen calendar (printable PDF)
 Australian pollen calendar (printable PDF)

Heuristics
Forensic techniques
Calendars